The Back Home Tour is a world tour by Irish boyband, Westlife in support of their 9th studio album, Back Home. The band will be touring the United Kingdom, Ireland and New Zealand. The tour was seen by 385,000 fans.

The tour is divided into two legs. The first leg kicked off in Belfast on 25 February and ended in London on 29 March 2008. The second leg started on a four-day visit to Australia for the promotion of the album and ended on 28 June 2008 at the Plymouth Argyle Football Club in England.

The 28-page tour programme was measuring 12" × 12", celebrating their 10 successful years as recording artists, crammed with stunning photos, spot lacquered images, interviews, personal messages from all 4 band members on lavish screen printed plastic pages and much more, with metallic-effect embossed outer cover. The DVD for this tour was filmed at Croke Park, Dublin on 1 June 2008.

This tour marked as the second Irish act to headline Croke Park Stadium after U2.

Support acts
The MacDonald Brothers (Europe—Leg 1, select dates)
Annabel Fay (Australasia)
Hope (London)
Shayne Ward (Dublin)

Setlist

"Hit You with the Real Thing"
"World of Our Own"
"Something Right"
"What Makes a Man"
"Uptown Girl" (with Acapella Intro)
"The Easy Way"
"If I Let You Go" (contains excerpts from "Where Is the Love?")
"Mandy"
Medley:
"SexyBack"
"Blame It on the Boogie"
"Get Down on It"
"I'm Your Man"
"Let Me Entertain You"
"I'm Already There"
Medley:
"Unbreakable"
"Queen of My Heart"
"Fool Again"
"Catch My Breath"
"Home"
"Us Against The World"
"Swear It Again"
"Flying Without Wings"
Encore
"When You're Looking Like That""You Raise Me Up" (contains elements of "My Heart Will Go On")

Notes:

 My Love was performed on the 25 February in Belfast/

Tour dates

Festivals and other miscellaneous performances
This concert was a part of the "Liverpool Summer Pops"

Cancellations and rescheduled shows

Box office score data

Live Concert DVD

The band's official website officially states on 2008 September that a DVD will be released entitled 10 Years of Westlife – Live at Croke Park Stadium.

 Video system: PAL
 Language: English
 No. of disks: 1
 Catalogue number: 88697389499
 Sound format: Stereo Dolby Digital 5.1
 Aspect ratio: 16:9, Widescreen – Aspect Ratio 4:3, Full Screen

Track listing

Chart performance
SOURCE:

Certifications and sales

Release history

References

External links

 Official Westlife Website

Westlife concert tours
Westlife video albums
2008 concert tours